Nitin Chandrakant Desai is a noted Indian art director and production designer of Indian cinema turned film and television producer, most known for his work in Marathi and Hindi Films, World Cultural Festival 2016 at Delhi and films like, Hum Dil De Chuke Sanam (1999), Lagaan (2001), Devdas (2002), Jodhaa Akbar (2008) and Prem Ratan Dhan Payo (2015). During his career spanning twenty years, he has worked with directors like Ashutosh Gowarikar, Vidhu Vinod Chopra, Rajkumar Hirani and Sanjay Leela Bhansali. In 2002, he turned film producer with Chandrakant Productions' Desh Devi, a devotional film on the Devi Mata of Kutch.

He has won National Film Award for Best Art Direction four times, and Filmfare Best Art Direction Award three times.

Early life and education
Desai's attended his school at Wamanrao Muranjan High School, Mulund in a Marathi Medium, He studied photography at the J.J. School of Art and L.S.Raheja school of arts, in Mumbai, before joining the films.

Career

He first went to Mumbai's Film City Studios in May 1987, and immediately switched from the 2-D format of still photography to a 3-D world of art direction. He joined noted art director, Nitish Roy as a fourth assistant for the period TV serial, Tamas (1987), directed by Govind Nihalani. Thereafter he worked TV series, Kabir for five-and-a-half years, series Chanakya for the first 25 episodes, and took over independently from the 26th episode onwards.

His first feature film was Adhikari Brothers's Bhookamp in 1993, but it was Vidhu Vinod Chopra's period film, 1942: A Love Story in 1994 that got him noticed. Over the years he has worked in films such as Parinda, Khamoshi, Maachis, Baadshah, Dr Babasaheb Ambedkar and Raju Chacha, international projects like Salaam Bombay!, Amok (a French film directed by Joel Farges, which won Desai a Pri Genie nomination), Jungle Book, Kama Sutra, the Canadian film Such a Long Journey and Holy Smoke. He also created two sets for Slumdog Millionaire 2008 film, which include the set of Kaun Banega Crorepati scene, incidentally he had also designed the set for the Star Plus TV series, and an interiors set of the Taj Mahal.

He turned film producer in 2003, with devotional film, Desh Devi Maa Ashapura. Situated on the outskirts of Mumbai at Karjat, the ND studios was opened in 2005 by him. He turned to producing TV series, with Marathi serial Raja Shivchhatrapati, which became a big hit.

In Marathi, he has produced a biopic movie Balgandharva released in May 2011. He has also produced a reality TV show Marathi Paul Padte Pudhe, which provides a platform for young talent. Concept is similar to America's Got Talent.

He was reportedly working on Amol Gupte's Sapno Ko Ginte Ginte. After producing Chittod Ki Rani Padmini Ka Johur (2009) TV series, he was reportedly producing historic TV series, Taj Mahal and Baji Rao Mastani.
In 2011, he also debuted as a lead actor by the Marathi film Hello Jai Hind directed by Gajendra Ahire.

Most of Desai's successful work as an art director has been in period films, as can be seen by the fact that all 4 of his National Film Award for Best Art Direction awards have been for period films.

Filmography

As actor

As director

As producer

As art director

As production designer

Awards and nominations

National Film Award for Best Art Direction

Filmfare Best Art Direction

IFA Best Art Direction Award

Screen Awards – Best Art Direction

Maharashtra State Film Awards – Best Art Direction

Genie Award for Best Achievement in Art Direction/Production Design

References

External links
 Nitin Desai Studio, Official website
 
 The Miracle Worker Screen

Living people
Sir Jamsetjee Jeejebhoy School of Art alumni
Indian art directors
Indian production designers
Film producers from Mumbai
Indian television producers
Filmfare Awards winners
Year of birth missing (living people)
Film directors from Mumbai
20th-century Indian designers
21st-century Indian designers
21st-century Indian film directors
Hindi-language film directors
Indian television directors
Best Production Design National Film Award winners